Ramonville XIII are a French Rugby league club based in Ramonville-Saint-Agne, Haute-Garonne in the Midi-Pyrénées region. The club plays in the French National Division 1. Their home ground is the Stade Mourlan

History 

The club only came to prominence during the 2010s, in 2013 they were relegated from the National Division 1 which prior to 2008 was the bottom league. The following season they won promotion back when they defeated RC Lescure-Arthes XIII 'A' in the final. 2014/15 saw the club reach the National Division 1 play-offs but they were beaten by US Trentels XIII. Season 2015/16 saw the club finish outside the play-offs in 6th place.

Honours 

 National Division 2 (1): 2013-14

See also

National Division 2

External links
 Club Website

French rugby league teams